Ali Adnan Kadhim Al-Tameemi (born 19 December 1993) is an Iraqi professional footballer who plays as a left-back for Russian club Rubin Kazan and the Iraq national team.

Adnan has played at the 2013 FIFA U-20 World Cup, where he was one of Iraq's star players as the underdogs went on a run to the semi-final. He won the 2013 Asian Young Footballer of the Year.

Club career

Early years
Adnan was graduated from the prestigious Ammo Baba Football School situated opposite the Al-Shaab Stadium, where he spent the early part of his football education. In his five years at the school, and despite being one of the youngest kids at the time, he excelled and progressed from the Baraem ("Buds") and Ashbal ("Cubs") teams. The player sees his time at the school as an important foundation of his career and a key part of his development. He moved from the school, to one of Iraq's top clubs Al-Zawraa – joining one of the best youth set-ups in the country, and also his uncle’s former club, playing at Nasha’een (Under 17) level and then the youth team. After spending a season in the youth team at city rivals Al-Quwa Al-Jawiya, he transferred to big spenders Baghdad FC.

Baghdad FC
There he first played for the Baghdad FC's youth side and was invited to the senior team by head coach Yahya Alwan, at a relatively young age but because of the depth in the squad, he returned to the youth set-up. It was only after Karim Kurdi was appointed head coach of the club in 2010, that Adnan became a regular with the seniors. The coach was able to give the attacking left sided player the confidence in his own abilities and Adnan went from strength to strength, dislodging his idol and teammate, the Iraqi international Bassim Abbas on the left flank, first at club level and then with Iraq. He scored seven goals for Baghdad FC in total. Two were in the 2010–11 season (against Naft Maysan and Al-Hassanin), three were in the 2011–12 season (two against Kirkuk FC and one against Al-Sinaa) and two were in the 2012–13 season (against Al-Minaa and Al-Kahraba).

During the 2013 winter transfer window, the player received an offer from Saudi club Ittihad FC, to replace Croatian player Anas Sharbini. However the deal fell through when his agent was unable to complete the transfer. The player had been expected to fly to Saudi Arabia to hold negotiations but obtaining a visa to Saudi Arabia would have taken two days and the transfer window would close on the following day, so the deal could not be completed.

Çaykur Rizespor

On 1 August 2013, Adnan officially agreed to sign a five-year contract deal with Çaykur Rizespor. He chose the shirt number 53, as it was the same year the club Çaykur Rizespor was established, in 1953, stating that he feels that Çaykur Rizespor is like his home.

On 1 September 2013, Adnan scored his first goal in the Turkish Süper Lig for Çaykur Rizespor against Kayseri Erciyesspor in the 7th minute from long distance. On 14 September 2013, Adnan scored his second goal with Çaykur Rizespor against Gaziantepspor from a free kick from 35 metres. Adnan contributed to his team with 4 goals and 10 assists, due to the football and the team he played, he became one of the fans' favorite footballers during his time playing at Çaykur Rizespor.

On 2 September 2013, Napoli made a €7 million transfer bid to Çaykur Rizespor for Adnan on a five-year deal, but it was rejected by Çaykur Rizespor's board of directors. According to the rizesporlular.com.

The following season, Adnan was a bench player or out of the squad. At the end of the season he moved to Italy.

Udinese
On 1 July 2015, Adnan was announced as Udinese's new signing with a five-year contract. This made Adnan the first ever Iraqi player to play in the Serie A. He made his competitive debut for the club in a 3–1 victory against Novara in the Coppa Italia, and his Serie A debut came in a 1–0 win away to defending champions Juventus. Adnan scored his first goal for the club by a free kick against Genoa where the game ended in a 2–1 defeat for his side. Adnan became a fan favorite at Udinese and impressed when he played. He had an impressive debut season in the Serie A, but his chances were limited in his second season after the arrival of a new manager and he was linked with moves away from the Italian club. Adnan impressed when he did play for Udinese, but his chances were limited as he was mainly used as a bench player and he has been linked with multiple moves away from the club.

Atalanta (loan)
On 17 August 2018, Adnan joined Atalanta on a season-long loan, in a deal that saw Marco D'Alessandro moving to Udinese in exchange. After a dispute with the manager, Gasperini, he was told he'd be out of the manager's plans for the season. Since the dispute occurred after the winter transfer market closed, he was forced to make a move to a league outside Europe to continue playing until the end of the season.

Vancouver Whitecaps FC
On 9 March 2019, Vancouver Whitecaps FC of Major League Soccer announced that they has secured a loan deal until the end of June, and made the transfer permanent in July 2019. On 3 July 2021, Whitecaps FC and Adnan agreed to a mutual contract termination due to complications with his Visa.

Vejle Boldklub
On 5 November 2021, the club officially announced the signing of Adnan after 4 months without a club. Less than a month after his arrival, Adnan suffered a serious knee injury: the Iraqi tore one of the cruciate ligaments in his knee, meaning he would be out for the rest of the season. In May 2022 Vejle confirmed, that Adnan would leave the club, as his contract had come to an end.

Rubin Kazan
On 11 August 2022, Russian First League side Rubin Kazan announced the signing of Adnan after he had spent a number of weeks training with the club.

International career

Iraq U-20
Adnan's breathtaking and scintillating performances were the highlight of the Iraq U-20's fairytale run to the semi-finals at the 2013 FIFA U-20 World Cup in Turkey. His goal against England U-20, that brought Iraq level at 2–2, epitomized his never-ending dynamism and drive. In the 93rd minute of the game, he cut inside from the by-line, bamboozling the opposition with his trickery, before darting past the English defense and blasting the ball past the keeper. His eagerness to get down the flank with his marauding runs; the ability to strike the ball from anywhere outside the penalty box with such ferocity and accuracy, and his all-round physical superiority over his competitors had caught the attention of observers at the tournament, and there were rumors that scouts from clubs from top European leagues had been watching the 19 year-old. He also managed to score the opening goal in the semi-finals against Uruguay U-20 from a narrow angle free-kick in a match ended 1–1 after extra time which saw Uruguay advance to the final by penalty shoot-out. During the tournament, several clubs had shown interest. Adnan has been linked with Spanish Club Sevilla, English club Arsenal, Turkish clubs Galatasaray, Bursaspor and Çaykur Rizespor, Italian clubs Genoa and Livorno. Also the Qatari club Al-Gharrafa showed interest in him. Adnan eventually signed for Caykur Rizespor.

Iraq U-23
Adnan was chosen as part of the olympic team squad that represented Iraq in the Rio Olympics 2016 and was very crucial to the games providing many chances and was chosen as man of the match against Denmark. But after Iraq's 1–1 draw with South Africa (in which Adnan played a great deal of even providing an assist), Iraq finished with only 3 points as 3rd place in the table after Brazil and Denmark. This caused Iraq to crash out of the Rio olympics in the group stage.

After the Olympics, Adnan announced his shock retirement from international football via Twitter. The announcement came as a shock to all Iraqis and it was met with a lot of criticism as well as pleads for him to return. In the video, posted to Twitter, Adnan said that he would not play for Iraq at any level and that he was putting an "X" on his international career. The decision reportedly came after the Iraqi Olympic team were criticised following their performance in Brazil. After his retirement, Adnan's father, Adnan Kadhim, was on a popular Iraqi football talk show and he spoke to Ali via phone live on air in front of millions of viewers and spoke to him about reversing his decision. Adnan eventually went back on his decision and came out of retirement and has since played for Iraq.

Iraq
On 3 December 2012 at the age of 18, he announced his arrival on the international stage when he made his debut for the national side against Bahrain in Doha. In the process, Adnan became the first graduate from Ammo Baba’s football school to play for the senior team, only eleven years after the foundation of the school.

The player had not been selected by Brazilian coach Zico prior to the Bahrain game, but after he left the job, due to a dispute over unpaid wages, Hakim Shaker, Adnan's youth coach, was appointed to take charge of the senior side, and his first decision was to take the step to call-up the left back for the game. His display cemented his place as the best left back in the country, winning plaudits for his displays at the 2012 WAFF Championship.

He scored his first goal for Iraq national team in a 3–1 win over China PR during 2015 AFC Asian Cup qualification.

Style of play
Adnan is compared to Roberto Carlos or Ian Harte as a left-back with a ferocious set piece accuracy. He is a tall but fast player, which blends well to Iraq’s counter-attack philosophy. Adnan is also an attack-minded left-back, possessing a strong physique and a powerful long-range shooting ability. Adnan bursts from the back straight into the opposite half of the field with some sublime footworks propelling him to go past defenders and midfielders with ease. Always brimming with energy and full of athleticism coupled with his unrivaled strength, opponents find it a tough task taming him who is often than not, seen in the third half of the field entertaining viewers with dazzling skills and screamers from long ranges. Adnan has still managed to stand out on account of his marauding runs down the left wing, as well as his useful habit of popping up with vitally important goals. In spite of his attacking prowess, Adnan serves as a good pillar for his team when defending. He is also very adapted to making long passes and crosses into the penalty area.

Personal life
Adnan was born in the Iraqi capital Baghdad in the Adhamiyah vicinity on 19 December 1993. Football runs through his family bloodline, with both his father and uncle having played at the top level during the 1970s and 80s. His father Adnan Kadhim played for the Iraqi youth team in 1977, and won the 1977 AFC Youth Championship in Iran, and was a part of the squad of the first Iraqi youth side to play at the 1977 FIFA World Youth Championship in Tunisia, that same year. However, even though he played for first division clubs Al-Shabab, Al-Tijara and Al-Rasheed, he never made the ascent from club football to senior international football.

His uncle Ali Kadhim is considered one of the best strikers in the history of the national team, and scored 35 goals for the national team, from 1970 to 1980. This was the national record until Hussein Saeed broke it in 1982.

Adnan Kadhim regards his father as his idol and teacher in both life and sport. Throughout his career, his father has been by his side and was often seen at the Baghdad stadium watching his son from the sidelines. When Adnan came out with his shock retirement from international football in 2016, his father called him on-air and spoke to him about reversing his decision and Adnan eventually returned to the national team.

Career statistics

Club

International goals
Scores and results list Iraq's goal tally first.

Honours

International
Iraq U-20
 AFC U-19 Championship runner-up: 2012
 FIFA U-20 World Cup 4th-place: 2013

Iraq U-23
 Asian Games bronze-medal: 2014

Iraq
 WAFF Championship runner-up: 2012
 Arabian Gulf Cup runner-up: 2013
 AFC Asian Cup fourth-place: 2015

Individual
 Asian Young Footballer of the Year: 2013
 Sky Sports' 2013 FIFA U-20 World Cup XI Team of the Tournament - Left back position.
 World Soccer Magazine's 2013 FIFA U-20 World Cup Top 10 stars of the Tournament.
 Goal.com's 2013 FIFA U-20 World Cup chosen among best top 10 players.
 Soccer Iraq Team of the Decade: 2010–2019

References

External links

 
 
 
 Ali Adnan on whitecapsfc.com

1993 births
Living people
Association football fullbacks
Iraqi footballers
Iraq international footballers
Sportspeople from Baghdad
Iraqi expatriate footballers
Iraqi expatriate sportspeople in Turkey
Iraqi expatriate sportspeople in Italy
Iraqi expatriate sportspeople in Denmark
Iraqi expatriate sportspeople in Canada
Iraqi expatriate sportspeople in Russia
Expatriate footballers in Turkey
Expatriate footballers in Italy
Expatriate soccer players in Canada
Expatriate men's footballers in Denmark
Expatriate footballers in Russia
Amanat Baghdad players
Çaykur Rizespor footballers
Udinese Calcio players
Atalanta B.C. players
Vancouver Whitecaps FC players
Vejle Boldklub players
FC Rubin Kazan players
Süper Lig players
Serie A players
Russian First League players
Footballers at the 2014 Asian Games
2015 AFC Asian Cup players
2019 AFC Asian Cup players
Asian Games medalists in football
Asian Games bronze medalists for Iraq
Footballers at the 2016 Summer Olympics
Olympic footballers of Iraq
Medalists at the 2014 Asian Games
Major League Soccer players
Designated Players (MLS)
Iraq youth international footballers